Cabbage is a leafy vegetable, derived from the species Brassica oleracea.

Cabbage may also refer to:

Plants
 Bok choy, sometimes referred to as Chinese cabbage
 Chinese cabbage, a similar leafy vegetable, derived from the species Brassica rapa
 Cordyline australis, a cabbage tree from New Zealand

Arts, entertainment, and media
 Cabbage (band), a rock band from Manchester, UK
 "Cabbage" (folk song), a Chinese folk song
 Cabbage (Gaelic Storm album) (2010)
 Cabbage (Super Junky Monkey album)
 Cabbage (video game), a video game prototype once in development at Nintendo.

Other uses
 Cabbage car, a type of control railcar used in the United States
 Cabbage, a slang term for Federal Reserve Notes, cash, or money in the United States of America
 Wesley Correira (born 1978), nicknamed Cabbage, American mixed martial arts fighter

See also
 Cabbage patch (disambiguation)
 CABG, an abbreviation for coronary artery bypass graft surgery